"Tocando Fondo" is a song written by Guatemalan singer-songwriter Ricardo Arjona for his eleventh studio album, 5to Piso (2008). The song was released as the third single from the album.

Music video 
The music video for "Tocando Fondo" was filmed in Mexico City. Website Estereofonica commented that the clip "traduces on a very literal way the meaning of the song." Arjona stated that "Tocando Fondo" talks about those feelings "that cane make us fall ina precipice."

Trackslisting

Charts
"Tocando Fondo" became a moderate hit form Arjona. On the Billboard Latin Songs chart, the song only managed to reach No.20, the first single from 5to Piso not to enter the top 10, after "Como Duele" reaching No.2 and "Sin Ti... Sin Mi" reaching No.4. The song proved more successful on the Latin Pop Songs component chart, reaching No.6 and thus becoming 5to Piso's third top ten hit on that list, after "Como Duele" at No.1 and "Sin Ti... Sin Mi" at No.4. On the year end charts, "Tocando Fondo" was the 28th best-performing single of 2009 on the Latin Pop Songs chart.

Weekly charts

Yearly charts

Release history

References 

2009 songs
Ricardo Arjona songs
Songs written by Ricardo Arjona